MIT BBS is a Chinese-language bulletin board system website. The name "Weiming" may also refer to the Weiming Lake at Peking University campus.

History
The forum was founded in 1997 by Chinese students studying at the Massachusetts Institute of Technology under bbs.mit.edu.

In 2002, the Chinese government blocked access to the entire mit.edu domain. Some have speculated that the main reason was to prevent domestic users from accessing the uncensored political discussions on this forum.

In 2004, to circumvent the block in place in China, a self-censored branch mitbbs.cn was opened to facilitate access by users in China.

Currently there were about 300 topic groups. The website claimed that it had hundreds of thousands of registered users, most of whom were Overseas Chinese, and 51% of their internet traffic was generated from within the US.

In July 2022, MIT BBS ceased operations. Other similar websites such as newmitbbs.com, wmkj.org, weiming.info, freeblueplanet.com, and mitbbsclub.com emerged.

Administration

After moving out of mit.edu, it was then managed by a company located in Beijing, China. Under the current administrator walklooktalk, in the last several years it saw accelerated commercialization, with more prominent space reserved for advertisers, as well as the creation of a spin-off website devoted to personal advertisement.

References 

Chinese Internet forums